The 2021 Ohio Valley Conference softball tournament was held at Choccolocco Park near the campus of Jacksonville State University in Oxford, Alabama from May 13 through May 15, 2021. The tournament winner earned the Ohio Valley Conference's automatic bid to the 2021 NCAA Division I softball tournament

Tournament

Bracket

References

Ohio Valley Conference softball tournament
Tournament
Ohio Valley Conference softball tournament